Communauté d'agglomération du Puy-en-Velay is the communauté d'agglomération, an intercommunal structure, centred on the town of Le Puy-en-Velay. It is located in the Haute-Loire department, in the Auvergne-Rhône-Alpes region, south-central France. Created in 2017, its seat is in Le Puy-en-Velay. Its area is 1324.0 km2. Its population was 82,871 in 2019, of which 19,215 in Le Puy-en-Velay proper.

Composition
The communauté d'agglomération consists of the following 72 communes:

Aiguilhe
Allègre
Arsac-en-Velay
Bains
Beaulieu
Beaune-sur-Arzon
Bellevue-la-Montagne
Blanzac
Blavozy
Bonneval
Borne
Le Brignon
Brives-Charensac
Céaux-d'Allègre
Ceyssac
Chadrac
La Chaise-Dieu
Chamalières-sur-Loire
La Chapelle-Bertin
La Chapelle-Geneste
Chaspinhac
Chaspuzac
Chomelix
Cistrières
Connangles
Coubon
Craponne-sur-Arzon
Cussac-sur-Loire
Espaly-Saint-Marcel
Félines
Fix-Saint-Geneys
Jullianges
Laval-sur-Doulon
Lavoûte-sur-Loire
Lissac
Loudes
Malrevers
Malvières
Mézères
Monistrol-d'Allier
Monlet
Le Monteil
Le Pertuis
Polignac
Le Puy-en-Velay
Roche-en-Régnier
Rosières
Saint-Christophe-sur-Dolaison
Saint-Étienne-Lardeyrol
Saint-Geneys-près-Saint-Paulien
Saint-Georges-Lagricol
Saint-Germain-Laprade
Saint-Hostien
Saint-Jean-d'Aubrigoux
Saint-Jean-de-Nay
Saint-Julien-d'Ance
Saint-Paulien
Saint-Pierre-du-Champ
Saint-Préjet-d'Allier
Saint-Privat-d'Allier
Saint-Victor-sur-Arlanc
Saint-Vidal
Saint-Vincent
Sanssac-l'Église
Sembadel
Solignac-sur-Loire
Vals-près-le-Puy
Vazeilles-Limandre
Vergezac
Vernassal
Le Vernet
Vorey

References

Puy-en-Velay
Puy-en-Velay